Goryachinsk is a rural locality (a selo) in Pribaykalsky District, Republic of Buryatia, Russia. The population was 967 as of 2010. There are 31 streets.

Geography 
Goryachinsk is located 121 km north of Turuntayevo (the district's administrative centre) by road. Turka is the nearest rural locality.

References 

Rural localities in Okinsky District
Populated places on Lake Baikal